The suroz (Balochi:  سُرود یا سُروز)  is a bowed string instrument with a long neck, similar to a fiddle or sarangi and played vertically. It is considered the national instrument of the Baloch people In Balochistan.

Construction and play
It has three or four main strings for playing which are tuned 1. low E - 2. low A - 3. a (440 Hz) - 4. e. Strings  one, two and four are made of steel while string three is made of thick gut. there are five to eight sympathetic strings, made of thin steel and tuned according to the raag to be played. The playing strings are some millimeters higher on the bridge than the sympathetic strings, so that the latter cannot be touched by the bow. The strings are not played like on the sarangi by pressing them with the nails, but by touching them with the fingers, but without pressing them onto the neck. 

The highest two strings are mostly fingered. The player uses the highest string up to an octave. The sound is very close to the Nepalese sarangi. In the south of Baluchistan there are smaller surozes, there the length of the playing strings is about 33-35 cm. In the north and in Sindh, the surozes can be much bigger, up to a string length of 45 cm. There the tuning is somewhat lower.

Cultural significance
The Baloch term for both music and musical instruments is sāz and the term for the player is sāzī. Within the Baloch culture until modern times, the caste associated with playing the suroz would be the ludi caste. Members of the caste would learn to play this instrument from their families because the art of instrumental music was considered a hereditary profession, as such upper caste Baloch would not be associated with the instrument. Recently members of both lower and upper social caste can be seen owning or playing the instrument.

Exponents

 Rasool Bakhsh
 Karim Bukhsh
 Mohammed Shakir
 Umar Surozi

References

Baloch musical instruments
Bowed instruments
String instruments
Necked box lutes